The 1951 Philadelphia Athletics season involved the A's finishing sixth in the American League with a record of 70 wins and 84 losses.

Offseason 
 November 16, 1950: Morrie Martin was drafted by the Athletics from the Brooklyn Dodgers in the 1950 rule 5 draft.

Regular season 
Ferris Fain won the American League batting championship with a .344 batting average.

Season standings

Record vs. opponents

Notable transactions 
 April 30, 1951: Lou Brissie was traded by the Athletics to the Cleveland Indians, and Paul Lehner was traded by the Athletics to the Chicago White Sox as part of a 3-team trade. The White Sox sent Gus Zernial and Dave Philley to the Athletics, and the Indians sent Sam Zoldak and Ray Murray to the Athletics. The Indians sent Minnie Miñoso to the White Sox.
 June 4, 1951: Kermit Wahl was traded by the Athletics to the Chicago White Sox for Hank Majeski.

Roster

Player stats

Batting

Starters by position 
Note: Pos = Position; G = Games played; AB = At bats; H = Hits; Avg. = Batting average; HR = Home runs; RBI = Runs batted in

Other batters 
Note: G = Games played; AB = At bats; H = Hits; Avg. = Batting average; HR = Home runs; RBI = Runs batted in

Pitching

Starting pitchers 
Note: G = Games pitched; IP = Innings pitched; W = Wins; L = Losses; ERA = Earned run average; SO = Strikeouts

Other pitchers 
Note: G = Games pitched; IP = Innings pitched; W = Wins; L = Losses; ERA = Earned run average; SO = Strikeouts

Relief pitchers 
Note: G = Games pitched; W = Wins; L = Losses; SV = Saves; ERA = Earned run average; SO = Strikeouts

Farm system

References

External links
1951 Philadelphia Athletics team page at Baseball Reference
1951 Philadelphia Athletics team page at www.baseball-almanac.com

Oakland Athletics seasons
Philadelphia Athletics
Oak